University of Nigeria Teaching Hospital is a federal government of Nigeria teaching hospital located in Ituku-Ozalla, Enugu State, Nigeria. The current chief medical director is Obinna Onodugo.

History
University of Nigeria Teaching Hospital was built in the early 20th century by the colonial administrators. After Nigeria gained independence in 1960, it changed into a general hospital. It was converted into a specialized hospital on July 1st, 1970 by the east central state government. The federal military government of Nigeria took over the hospital by decree number 23 of 1974, while leaving the management in the hands of the council of University of Nigeria. In July 1976 after the appointment of an autonomous management board, the hospital became independent. On 8 January 2007, the hospital moved to a permanent site at Ituku-Ozalla.

Departments
The hospital consists of 41 main departments with three outposts namely.
University of Nigeria Teaching Hospital, Comprehensive Health Center, Obukpa
University of Nigeria Teaching Hospital, Comprehensive Health Center, Abagana
University of Nigeria Teaching Hospital, Comprehensive Health Center, Isuochi

Schools
The hospital consists of 9 schools.
Post Ophthalmic Nursing
Medical Records
School of Nursing
Medical Laboratory Science
Peri-Operative Nursing
Nurse Anaesthetists
Cardiothoracic Nursing
Midwifery
Community Health

References

University of Nigeria
Teaching hospitals in Nigeria